Daniel Dixon or Danny Dixon may refer to:
 Sir Daniel Dixon, 1st Baronet (1844–1907), Lord Mayor of Belfast
 Daniel Dixon, 2nd Baron Glentoran (1912–1995), soldier and politician
 Daniel Dixon (basketball) (born 1994), American basketball player
 Daniel Dixon (triathlete) (born 2002), English triathlete
Danny Dixon, a character in Pumpkinhead II: Blood Wings
Danny Dixon, a character in The Runaway